is a former professional Japanese tennis player.

In her career, Ozaki won six singles titles on the ITF Women's Circuit. On 24 April 2017, she reached her best singles ranking of world No. 70. On 6 March 2017, she peaked at No. 246 in the WTA doubles rankings.

Ozaki made her WTA Tour debut at the 2013 Tashkent Open, having entered the qualifying tournament and defeating Veronika Kapshay and Ksenia Palkina for a spot in the main draw. She was thereby pitted against fellow qualifier Kateryna Kozlova and defeated the Ukrainian in straight sets, simultaneously recording her first main-draw win at the WTA Tour-level. She was subsequently beaten in the second round by Nastassja Burnett in a final-set tiebreak.

Performance timelines

Only main-draw results in WTA Tour, Grand Slam tournaments, Fed Cup/Billie Jean King Cup and Olympic Games are included in win–loss records.

Singles
Current through the 2022 Miami Open.

WTA career finals

Doubles: 1 (runner-up)

ITF Circuit finals

Singles: 16 (7 titles, 9 runner–ups)

Doubles: 1 (runner–up)

Notes

References

External links
 
 
 

1994 births
Living people
Sportspeople from Hyōgo Prefecture
Japanese female tennis players
Asian Games medalists in tennis
Tennis players at the 2014 Asian Games
Asian Games bronze medalists for Japan
Medalists at the 2014 Asian Games
21st-century Japanese women